One Day Wonder is an album by the Terraza Big Band, a jazz ensemble led by saxophonist Michael Thomas and bassist Edward Perez. It received a Grammy Award nomination for Best Large Jazz Ensemble Album.

References

2019 albums
Jazz albums